Saint-André-Avellin Aerodrome  is located  northwest of Saint-André-Avellin, Quebec, Canada.

References

Registered aerodromes in Outaouais